KNZA is a commercial  FM radio station in Hiawatha, Kansas, operating on 103.9 MHz.  The station broadcasts with 50,000 watts effective radiated power from a 5840-foot tower giving it a strong signal throughout Northeast Kansas.

History
KNZA-FM was originally built by Mike Carter in 1977, in a field 6 miles south of Hiawatha, Kansas.   Carter and his staff stressed personalized rapport with the listening audience, with a country music and farm information format, and quickly built a faithful audience at a time when few cars or homes had FM radios.   The station placed heavy emphasis in community involvement, broadcasting the play by play of as many as 100 regional high school football and basketball games every year.

In 1985, Carter sold his interest in KNZA to two employees, Gregory Buser and Robert Hilton, who are the current owners and continued to operate with the same successful philosophy.

Current format
Along with offering a mix of modern and classic country music, the station provides full service coverage of northeast Kansas, northwest Missouri and southeast Nebraska. 
Local news, weather and sports, including play by play broadcasts of local and regional high school athletics, make up much of the station's broadcast schedule. 
Long form local news casts are offered at the top of the hour at 6:00 am, 7:00 am, 8:00 am, 12:00 pm and 5:00 pm during the week, with only the 6 am news eliminated on weekends. 
One-minute headline newscasts are broadcast from 9:00 in the morning until 4:00 in the afternoon Monday through Friday, while 6:00 pm and 10:00 pm news summaries are also scheduled. The station's news is also found online at mscnews.net. 
The contents of the news and sports are originated in house, and focus on content focused on the immediate, and regional communities covered by the station.
The station also places an emphasis on agriculture broadcasting, utilizing the Brownfield Network for daily updates.
The station features a morning show Monday through Friday hosted by L.J. Trant, featuring locally originated content, including interviews with local news makers. 
Along with Trant, who serves as station Program Director, the rest of the full-time on-air staff is as follows: 
Michael Norton, Announcer/Music Director;  
Brian Hagen-Corporate News Director; 
Greg Bebermeyer-Station News Director; 
Justin Fluke-Sports Director/play by play; 
Mike Smith-Sports/play by play; 
Jeff Nichols-Announcer;
Mike Gilmore, Station Manager.

External links

NZA
Country radio stations in the United States
Radio stations established in 1977